Federico Gastón Nieto (born 26 August 1983) is an Argentine professional footballer who plays as a striker for Barcelona SC.

Career
Nieto was born in Buenos Aires. He previously played for Almagro, with a loan spell at Scottish club Rangers in 2005 where he scored three times, once in the league against Dunfermline and twice against Clyde in the League Cup.

In 2007 Nieto returned to Argentina to play for Huracán, in 2008 he joined Banfield and in January 2009 he was loaned back to Huracán where he was a member of the squad that finished in 2nd place in the Clausura 2009 tournament.

In 2009, he joined Colón de Santa Fe where he started well with four goals in his first six games with the club.

Since 2010 he has been playing in Atlético Paranaense where, after a not so good 2010 season, he became one of the most important players of the team in 2011, scoring seven goals at a total of seven games played.

References

External links
 
 Argentine Primera statistics at Fútbol XXI  

1983 births
Living people
Footballers from Buenos Aires
Argentine people of Spanish descent
Association football forwards
Argentine footballers
Argentine expatriate footballers
Club Almagro players
Rangers F.C. players
C.F. Estrela da Amadora players
Hellas Verona F.C. players
Club Atlético Huracán footballers
Racing Club de Avellaneda footballers
Club Atlético Colón footballers
Club Athletico Paranaense players
Barcelona S.C. footballers
S.D. Quito footballers
Boca Unidos footballers
Expatriate footballers in Brazil
Expatriate footballers in Italy
Expatriate footballers in Portugal
Expatriate footballers in Scotland
Expatriate footballers in Ecuador
Argentine expatriate sportspeople in Brazil
Argentine expatriate sportspeople in Italy
Argentine expatriate sportspeople in Portugal
Argentine expatriate sportspeople in Scotland
Argentine Primera División players
Scottish Premier League players
Primera Nacional players
Primeira Liga players
Serie B players
Campeonato Brasileiro Série A players
Ecuadorian Serie A players